Andrew Z. Hong is an American chess grandmaster.

Chess career
Hong became interested in chess in 2012, and was introduced to the game by his older brother. He then joined the same chess club and began playing in competitive tournaments. He was nationally ranked #1 for his age group. Hong was part of the KCF Young Stars Program, run by 15-time former World Champion Garry Kasparov.

In September 2021, Hong defeated Ian Nepomniachtchi and Wesley So at the PRO Chess League Arena Royale. Hong later earned the title of Grandmaster after achieving his final norm at the Charlotte Chess Center & Scholastic Academy Labor Day Norm Invitational in North Carolina.

In 2022, Hong participated in both the U.S. Junior Chess Championship and the Chess.com-hosted Junior Speed Chess Championship.

References

Living people
2004 births
American chess players
Chess grandmasters
Sportspeople from San Jose, California